was a Japanese middle-distance runner who competed in the 1952 Summer Olympics.

References

1920 births
2001 deaths
Japanese male middle-distance runners
Japanese male long-distance runners
Japanese male steeplechase runners
Olympic male middle-distance runners
Olympic athletes of Japan
Athletes (track and field) at the 1952 Summer Olympics
Asian Games gold medalists for Japan
Asian Games silver medalists for Japan
Asian Games bronze medalists for Japan
Asian Games medalists in athletics (track and field)
Athletes (track and field) at the 1951 Asian Games
Athletes (track and field) at the 1954 Asian Games
Athletes (track and field) at the 1958 Asian Games
Medalists at the 1951 Asian Games
Medalists at the 1954 Asian Games
Medalists at the 1958 Asian Games
Japan Championships in Athletics winners
20th-century Japanese people
21st-century Japanese people